Mattia Morello (born 21 July 1999) is an Italian professional footballer who plays as a winger for  club Fiorenzuola.

Club career
Born in Treviglio, Morello started his career in Pergolettese youth system, and was promoted to the first team in 2017. He was part of the promotion to Serie C in 2019.

On 20 July 2022, Morello signed a two-year contract with Fiorenzuola.

Honours
Pergolettese
 Serie D (Group D): 2018–19

References

External links
 
 

1999 births
Living people
People from Treviglio
Footballers from Lombardy
Italian footballers
Association football wingers
Serie C players
Serie D players
U.S. Pergolettese 1932 players
U.S. Fiorenzuola 1922 S.S. players